This is list of archives in Estonia.

 Estonian Folklore Archives
 National Archives of Estonia
 Estonian Film Archives
 Estonian State Archives
 Estonian Historical Archives
 Tallinn City Archives

See also 

 List of archives
 List of museums in Estonia
 Culture of Estonia

 
Archives
Estonia
Archives